Bartles & Jaymes is a flavored wine cooler and malt beverage line produced by the E & J Gallo Winery in the United States, introduced in 1985, and available in various fruit flavors.

TV commercials
The product line is remembered for its folksy television commercials, created by Hal Riney, which ran from 1984 to 1991. Two older gentlemen characters, Frank Bartles and Ed Jaymes, sat on a front porch and related their new discoveries or projects on which they were working. The characters were patterned after the winery's founders, Ernest and Julio Gallo. Occasionally ads would be a twist on the idea of senior citizens or folksiness, such as having the pair fly an old-fashioned biplane over a beach, then airdrop crates of their product which were received by grateful young party animals. Bartles did all the talking, and ended each commercial with the tagline, "... and thank you for your support."

David Rufkahr played Frank Bartles and Dick Maugg played Ed Jaymes. Prior to their work on the ads, neither Rufkahr nor Maugg had been an actor: Rufkahr, a career Air Force veteran and cattle rancher from Redmond, Oregon, won the job in a talent search, whereas Dick Maugg was a general contractor from Santa Rosa, California.

David Rufkahr died of a heart attack in April 1996, in Bend, Oregon, at the age of 61.  Dick Maugg died of cancer in Santa Rosa on July 28, 2015; he was 83. His death was reported to news outlets by his family on October 27, 2015.

Flavors
Current flavors include:

Discontinued flavors include:

In popular culture
Indie folk band The Mountain Goats reference Bartles & Jaymes on the song "You or Your Memory" from their 2005 album The Sunset Tree.

The Lonely Island references Bartles & Jaymes on the song "3-Way (The Golden Rule)" from their 2013 album The Wack Album.

Band of Horses reference Bartles & Jaymes on the song "Neighbor" from their 2010 album Infinite Arms.

Indie singer-songwriter Mark Kozelek references Bartles & Jaymes on the song "My Love for You is Undying" from his 2018 self-titled album.

In the 2008 film “the Hottie and the Nottie,” the character June Phigg is shown drinking Bartles & Jaymes wine coolers.

Rapper Spice 1 references Bartles & Jaymes in the song "187 Proof" from his 1992 self-titled album Spice 1.

Weird Paul Petroskey references Bartles and Jaymes in the song "Wine Coolers" from his 2006 album "Medically Necessary" and 2012 album "25 Years of Lo-Fi".

Joshilyn Jackson’s 2021 psychothriller novel “Mother May I” references Bartles & Jaymes wine coolers (pg 126), describing them as “sticky-sweet.”

John C. McGinley's (Doctor Cox) character in Scrubs make a reference to it in one of his rants towards Zach Braff's (J.D.) character.

Rapper LL Cool J references "sipping on this Bartles & Jaymes premium peach flavored wine cooler" in the track "To Da Break Of Dawn" from his 1990 album "Mama Said Knock You Out"

Paulie Shore referenced in movie Son in Law

Wonder Woman 1984 references Bartles and James is being drank by Kristen Wiig In Lunch seen with Gal Gadot.

References

External links
Official site
TV Acres Advertising Mascots

Premixed alcoholic drinks
Products introduced in 1981